The free fall machine (FFM) is designed to permit the development of small biological sample such as cell cultures with a simulated effect of micro-gravity, under free fall conditions.

Description

The free fall machine (FFM) addresses some of the problems of the simple horizontal clinostat or random positioning machines (RPM). In a typical machine samples are allowed to cycle between free fall for about a metre down a column (micro-gravity simulation, near "0 g") and a "bounce" back to the top of the column that is intended to be so fast (c. 20 g for 20 ms) that it is undetected by the biological sample. Long duration of hyper-gravity is often simulated by machines such as the large diameter centrifuge (LDC) at ESA. To simulate partial-gravity (between simulated 0 and Earth's gravity, 1, such as Mars or Moon gravitational strengths) conditions, an RPM can also be used. The sample therefore effectively grows at near 0 g.

See also
 Gravitropism
 Large Diameter Centrifuge
 Random Positioning Machine
 Clinostat

References

External links
 ETH Space Biology Free Fall Machine

Laboratory equipment